The 2009 Men's European Volleyball League was the six edition of the annual men's volleyball tournament, played by twelve European countries from June 5 to July 12, 2009. The final Four was held in Portimão, Portugal from July 18 to July 19.

The tournament was won by Germany, defeating the Spain by 3–2 in the finals.

Teams

League round

Pool A

|}

Leg 1

|}

Leg 2

|}

Leg 3

|}

Leg 4

|}

Leg 5

|}

Leg 6

|}

Pool B

|}

Leg 1

|}

Leg 2

|}

Leg 3

|}

Leg 4

|}

Leg 5

|}

Leg 6

|}

Pool C

|}

Leg 1

|}

Leg 2

|}

Leg 3

|}

Leg 4

|}

Leg 5

|}

Leg 6

|}

Final four
Qualified teams
, as host

Semifinals

|}

3rd place match

|}

Final

|}

Final standing

Awards

Most Valuable Player
  Jochen Schöps
Best Scorer
  Martin Nemec
Best Spiker
  Jochen Schöps
Best Blocker
  György Grozer

Best Server
  Valdir Sequeira
Best Setter
  Miguel Ángel Falasca
Best Receiver
  André Lopes
Best Libero
  Martin Pipa

References
 Official website

European Volleyball League
E
V
V